"Numbskull" is a single released by Ash on 26 April 1999 as a limited edition, individually numbered single of 5,000 on CD and double 7" vinyl. The song, "Numbskull", appeared as track 7 on the album, Nu-Clear Sounds (5 October 1998), and also as the final track on Intergalactic Sonic 7″s (9 September 2002).

The controversial video for the single was directed by Darran Tiernan and featured self-mutilation, sex, drugs and Wheeler naked.

Track listing
All songs by Tim Wheeler unless otherwise noted.

CD
 "Numbskull"
 "Blew" (Kurt Cobain)
 "Who You Drivin' Now" (Mudhoney)
 "Jesus Says (Live)" – (21 September 1998) (Wheeler/Mark Hamilton)
 "Girl From Mars (Live)" – (31 July 1995)
 "Fortune Teller (Live)" (Wheeler/Hamilton)

7"
 "Numbskull"
 "Blew" (Kurt Cobain) 
 "Who You Drivin' Now" (Mudhoney)
 "Jesus Says" (live) (Wheeler/Hamilton)

Ash (band) songs
1999 songs
1999 singles